Matteo Lignani (born September 7, 1991) is an Italian professional football player who currently plays as a midfielder for Trestina.

Club career
He made his Serie A debut for Livorno on May 9, 2010 in a game against Lazio when he came on as a substitute in the 87th minute for Davide Moro.

On 5 September 2012, he joined CFR Cluj on loan.

References

External links
 

1991 births
People from Città di Castello
Footballers from Umbria
Living people
Italian footballers
Association football midfielders
Serie A players
Serie B players
Serie D players
U.S. Livorno 1915 players
CFR Cluj players
SC Kriens players
A.C. Perugia Calcio players
A.C. Ancona players
Vis Pesaro dal 1898 players
Italian expatriate footballers
Expatriate footballers in Romania
Expatriate footballers in Switzerland
Sportspeople from the Province of Perugia